Nicole Callinan (born 26 December 1982) is an Australian rules footballer playing for the Western Bulldogs in the AFL Women's competition. Callinan was drafted by the Western Bulldogs with their eleventh selection and eighty-fifth overall in the 2016 AFL Women's draft. She made her debut in the thirty-two point win against  at VU Whitten Oval in the opening round of the 2017 season. She played every match in her debut season to finish with seven games.

References

External links 

1982 births
Living people
Western Bulldogs (AFLW) players
Australian rules footballers from Victoria (Australia)
Darebin Falcons players